Valestrand Church is a parish church of the Church of Norway in Sveio Municipality in Vestland county, Norway. It is located in the village of Valestrand, just south of the village of Valevåg. It is one of the churches for the Valestrand og Førde parish which is part of the Sunnhordland prosti (deanery) in the Diocese of Bjørgvin. The white, wooden church was built in a long church design in 1873 using plans drawn up by the architect Ole Vangberg. The church seats about 420 people.

History

The Valestrand area had historically been part of the Valen Church parish. By the 1870s, that church was too small and it was decided to build a new church. The church was built by Jacobsen and Thorsen according to drawings by Ole Vangberg. The new church was consecrated on 15 October 1873 by the Bishop Peter Hersleb Graah Birkeland. The old Valen Church was then rebuilt as a schoolhouse.

See also
List of churches in Bjørgvin

References

Sveio
Churches in Vestland
Long churches in Norway
Wooden churches in Norway
19th-century Church of Norway church buildings
Churches completed in 1873
1873 establishments in Norway